Liam Peters (born 24 January 1997) is a South African cricketer. He made his Twenty20 debut for Mpumalanga in the 2018 Africa T20 Cup on 15 September 2018. In April 2021, he was named in Mpumalanga's squad, ahead of the 2021–22 cricket season in South Africa.

References

External links
 

1997 births
Living people
South African cricketers
Mpumalanga cricketers
Place of birth missing (living people)